Rajesh Verma may refer to:
Rajesh Verma (politician) (born in 1960) is an Indian  politician and a member of the Bhartiya Janta Party.
Rajesh Verma (cricketer) (1981–2022) was an Indian first-class cricketer who plays for Mumbai.